"Made Me Hard" a song by Australian band, The Whitlams. Released in May 2001 as the third and final single from their fourth album, Love This City. It peaked at number 75 in Australia. A music video for the song was filmed in Thailand.

Track listing
"Made Me Hard" – 3:33
"Gough" (JJJ Live at the Wireless, Nov. 1999) – 3:22
"Charlie No.3" (JJJ Live at the Wireless, Nov. 1999) – 4:14
"Blow Up the Pokies" (MCM Cold Live at the chapel, May 2000) – 3:28

Charts

References

The Whitlams songs
2001 singles
2001 songs